Inverie is the main village on the Knoydart peninsula in the Scottish Highlands. It is located on the north side of Loch Nevis and, although on the mainland of Britain, the network of single-track roads surrounding the village is not connected to the rest of the road network. Inverie is only reachable by a  hike over mountainous terrain or by a regular  ferry from Mallaig. This physical isolation gives the village a Guinness National Record for remoteness within the United Kingdom.

Geography
Inverie lies on the north side of Loch Nevis. On approach by sea, Sgurr Coire Choinnichean at  forms an impressive backdrop.

The Inverie ferry sails from Mallaig. It runs several times a day year-round with a second, competing ferry service, MV Western Isles, operating on weekdays from the start of April to the end of October.

Local people
 Alasdair mac Mhaighstir Alasdair (c.1698-1770), poet who wrote many immortal works of Scottish Gaelic literature and local Tacksman of Clan MacDonald of Clanranald.

Amenities
The Old Forge pub at Inverie holds the Guinness World Record for the remotest pub in mainland Great Britain, being furthest from roads connected to the national network in time and journey distance. After being owned and operated for 10 years by Belgian Jean-Pierre Robinet, in March 2022 it was purchased as community property by the residents of the Knoydart peninsula through The Old Forge Community Benefit Society and is to reopen after renovations.

A few bed and breakfasts compete with rental lodges, cottages, and a campsite for tourists' patronage throughout the year. Knoydart Lodge and the Hide opened as luxury accommodation in the 21st century, and there is a shop and a meal caterer.

References

Populated places in Lochaber